Neoveitchia is a genus of palm trees. It contains two known species, native to certain islands in the western Pacific:

 Neoveitchia brunnea Dowe - Vanuatu
 Neoveitchia storckii (H.Wendl.) Becc. - Fiji

References

 
Arecaceae genera
Flora of Fiji
Taxa named by Odoardo Beccari
Taxonomy articles created by Polbot
Flora of Vanuatu